CustomerXPs is a Bengaluru-based software product company providing financial crime risk management and customer experience management solutions to banking institutions. Founded in 2006, the company sells its financial crime risk management software product under the brand name Clari5. CustomerXPs is identified as one of the top 100 global regtech companies.

History
CustomerXPs was founded in 2006 by Rivi Varghese, Aditya Lal, Balaji Suryanarayana and Sandhya V. The company launched Clari5 is launched in 2012 and a year later received funding of $4 million from JAFCO Asia. In 2014, CustomerXPs launched Clari5 sherlock to fight multichannel banking frauds with Big Data Analytics and was recognized as one of Gartner’s top vendors for online banking fraud detection.

In 2017, CustomerXPs had managed 200 million accounts at a single site, which is one of the largest real-time implementations.

Funding 
In 2008, Sharad Hegde, former Infosys chief technology officer, became an angel investor in CustomerXPs by investing about $1 million. In January 2011, CustomerXPs raised Series A funding of $4 million from investment firm JAFCO Asia. CustomerXPs has also received funding from Microsoft Accelerator.

References 

Software companies of India